Francis Camerini (born 25 January 1948 in Marseille) is a retired professional French association football defender.

External links
 
 
Profile on French federation official site 

1948 births
Living people
French footballers
France international footballers
Association football defenders
AS Saint-Étienne players
OGC Nice players
Ligue 1 players